44th New York Film Critics Circle Awards
January 28, 1979

Best Picture: 
 The Deer Hunter 
The 44th New York Film Critics Circle Awards honored the best filmmaking of 1978. The winners were announced on 20 December 1978 and the awards were given on 28 January 1979.

Winners
Best Actor:
Jon Voight - Coming Home
Runners-up: Gary Busey - The Buddy Holly Story and Robert De Niro - The Deer Hunter
Best Actress: 
Ingrid Bergman - Autumn Sonata (Höstsonaten)
Runners-up: Jill Clayburgh - An Unmarried Woman and Jane Fonda - Coming Home and Comes a Horseman
Best Director: 
Terrence Malick - Days of Heaven
Runners-up: Paul Mazursky - An Unmarried Woman and Ingmar Bergman - Autumn Sonata (Höstsonaten)
Best Film:
The Deer Hunter
Runners-up: Days of Heaven and An Unmarried Woman
Best Foreign Language Film:
Bread and Chocolate (Pane e cioccolata) • Italy
Runners-up: Autumn Sonata (Höstsonaten) and A Slave of Love (Raba lyubvi)
Best Screenplay: 
Paul Mazursky - An Unmarried Woman
Runners-up: Larry Gelbart and Sheldon Keller - Movie Movie, Franco Brusati, Jaja Fiastri and Nino Manfredi - Bread and Chocolate (Pane e cioccolata) and Bertrand Blier - Get Out Your Handkerchiefs (Préparez vos mouchoirs)
Best Supporting Actor: 
Christopher Walken - The Deer Hunter
Runners-up: Richard Farnsworth - Comes a Horseman and Barry Bostwick - Movie Movie
Best Supporting Actress: 
Maureen Stapleton - Interiors
Runners-up: Maggie Smith - California Suite and Meryl Streep - The Deer Hunter

References

External links
1978 Awards

1978
New York Film Critics Circle Awards, 1978
New York Film Critics Circle Awards
New York
New York Film Critics Circle Awards
New York Film Critics Circle Awards